Nora of Kelmendi is a legendary folktale 17th century Albanian woman for her beauty and valor.

She is sometimes referred to as the  "Helen of Albania" as her beauty also sparked a great war. She is also called the Albanian Brünhilde too, for she herself was the greatest woman warrior in the history of Albania.  There are two versions of Nora's legend; both end with Nora killing the Pasha, head of the Ottoman Army, who had vowed to reduce the Highland into ashes if Nora did not become his wife.

Legend 
The events happened around the year 1637, while other older sources place the culmination of Clementi-Ottoman clash during 1638 or 1639. Nora’s father, a noble warrior, wanted a son to help him fight against the Ottoman Empire. When Nora was born, he abandoned her at an orphanage. His sister, knowing the doings of her brother, adopted Nora and raised her as a boy. Nora's biological father, having the desire to train some young man to become a fighter, decided to train the adopted "son" of his sister.  Hence, unknowingly, he trained his own daughter to become a fighter. As she grew up, however, Nora turned out to be the most beautiful girl in Malsia. It is said that she was as pretty as a true Zana (mountain fairy). Her fame spread through the whole country. A pasha who resided at the Rozafati Castle in Shkodra, heard of her too. One day, Nora came down to the city with her parents. The pasha came out of the castle and fell in love with Nora upon setting eyes on her.

Being from nearby Bosnia, which followed similar traditions to Albania, the pasha wanted to marry her by the laws of the Albanian Canon, which meant he would send a trusted man to Nora’s house and ask for her hand.  However, Nora's family replied that the Albanian Canon did not allow for marriages with non-Albanians. The pasha was not accustomed to such refusal and kept a harem of women from far and wide.  He flew into a rage: "Either Nora will become my wife or I will burn all of Malsia to ashes." The pasha then led his army and besieged Malsia. Nora had proved to be a warrior, but now she had to prove that she was wise too, in order to spare Malsia from destruction.  So she devised the plan to kill the angry Bosnian pasha.

There are two versions of the story.  In the first version, Nora pretended to want to marry the Pasha without the permission of her family. Dressed with the djubletah, traditional North Albanian women dress, she went to the pasha's tent. Seeing her, the Pasha fell on his knees and began to pray, believing she was a true gift from heaven as a reward from the almighty Allah for his services to Him. The pasha ordered his troops to rest and prepare to go back to Shkodra.  The soldiers happily put down their arms and celebrated by putting their noses into their bags of hashish.  When all was quiet around the pasha's tent, Nora retrieved a war dagger that her father had given her, a dagger that had been passed through her family for many generations.  It was believed the dagger had magical powers, for no one who had carried it had died from wounds inflicted by opponents—highly unusual at that time and in this turbulent region. Nora stabbed the pasha, kicked him on back of his head, and choked him so he could not scream. The pasha fell on his Persian rug. At that point Nora could no longer stab him because by Albanian custom, it is dishonorable to strike a man who is not standing or to hit a man who does not fight back.  Nora fled and, as planned, the army of Malsia attacked the Ottomans, winning temporary victory over them. The pasha survived his wounds, gathered his own special unit and followed Nora to her home.

In a second version of the legend, Nora never goes to the tent. Instead, as the armies fought, several of the Ottomans broke away from the main body of the army to attack the villages. Nora led an army of 300 women against the Ottomans who had set off to burn, pillage and rape. In battle, Nora came face to face with the pasha and kills him in a duel.

In both versions, Nora kills the pasha in a fair duel. Both versions name the pasha as Vutsi Pasha from Bosnia.

Historical events
Historical sources give a less folkloric version of the story, focusing more on the ongoing struggle of over a decade between the Ottomans and Clementi highlanders initially due to their collaboration with the Montenegrins, and their fame as the most stubborn between Albanian tribes, rather than the portrait of Nora or any other local heroine, though they mention that women fought as well. According to Pjetër Bogdani's Cuneus Prophetarum, there were around 500 Kelmendi attacking the Ottoman army of 12,000. François Lenormant in his Turcs et Monténégrins (Paris, 1866) mentions an Ottoman army of over 30,000 with 900 on the Clementi side, while the conflict starts in 1624 and spikes in 1638. Another description comes from Father F. Arcangelo da Salto, theologian and counsellor of Savoy and consultant of the Holy See, who mentions around 700 Clementi, and the Ottoman casualties around 4,000, published in Vita del Venerabile Padre Fr.Bonaventura da Palazzuolo Riformato, vol.II, Venice, October 1722.

See also
Malësia
Yanitza Martinay

References

Sources

17th-century deaths
Legendary Albanian people
Albanian legends
17th-century Albanian people
Women in 17th-century warfare
Female duellists
Year of death unknown
Year of birth unknown
Albanian Roman Catholics
Women in European warfare